Tiago João Luís Pereira (born 19 September 1993) is a Portuguese athlete. Pereira competed in the men's triple jump at the 2020 Tokyo Olympics, where he placed 9th.

References

External links
Tiago Pereira at Eurosport

Living people
1993 births
Portuguese male triple jumpers
Olympic athletes of Portugal
Athletes (track and field) at the 2020 Summer Olympics
Athletes from Lisbon
Athletes (track and field) at the 2022 Mediterranean Games
Mediterranean Games bronze medalists for Portugal
Mediterranean Games medalists in athletics
World Athletics Championships athletes for Portugal